The Taylorville Tailors were a minor league baseball teams based in Taylorville, Illinois between 1907 and 1911. The Taylorville Tailors played as members of the Class D level Eastern Illinois League from 1907 to 1908. Following the folding of the Eastern Illinois League, the 1911 Taylorville Christians played the season as members of the Class D level Illinois-Missouri League.

History
The 1907 Taylorville Tailors began minor league play as charter members of the Eastern Illinois League. The league was formed under league president L. A. G. Shoaff as a six–team, Class D level league. The 1908 Spalding Guide indicated the league was founded in Pana, Illinois and the league's "godfather" was Joe Adams, also known as "Old Wagon Tongue," who would later manage the 1911 Taylorville team. In 1907 the league teams had a salary limit of $600 for their rosters. The Centralia White Stockings, Charleston Broom Corn Cutters, Mattoon Giants, Pana Coal Miners and Shelbyville Queen Citys joined Taylorville as charter members of the league.

After beginning league play on May 12, 1907, the Taylorville Tailors finished the 1907 Eastern Illinois League season in 3rd place in the six–team league. The Tailors finished with a 60–58 record under managers Phil Ketter and Billy Ryan. Ketter led the Eastern Illinois league in hitting (.284) and in hits with 111. Taylorville finished 14.0 games behind the 1st place Mattoon Giants in the final Eastern Illinois League standings.

Taylorville continued play in the 1908 Eastern Illinois League, but the league folded during the season. An evangelical movement led by former major league player Billy Sunday promoted a ballot item on April 7, 1908 that sought to abolish alcohol in the region. After the election, six of the Eastern Illinois League’s eight franchise cities voted to become dry and the league began to suffer financially, as Sunday games and support from saloons were eliminated. Affected by finances, the Charleston Evangelists and Mattoon Giants folded on June 30, 1908, leaving six teams. On July 17, 1908, the Pana Coal Miners relocated to Linton, Indiana and the Danville Speakers moved to Staunton, Illinois in efforts to remain viable. On August 20, 1908, the Shelbyville franchise folded and the Eastern Illinois League permanently folded on the same date. Playing under managers Walter Diehl and Billy Ryan, Taylorville was in 2nd place with a 56–39 record, 10.5 games behind the 1st place Staunton team when the league permanently folded.

Taylorville returned a team to minor league baseball play in 1911.  The Taylorville Christians joined the Class D level Illinois-Missouri League. The Christians finished with a 47–82 record to place 6th in the six–team league. Taylorville finished 27.0 games behind the 1st place Clinton Champs, playing their final season under managers Fred Donovan, Joe Adams and Oscar Denny.

The Taylorville Christians did not return to the Illinois-Missouri league in 1912. Taylorville, Illinois has not hosted another minor league team.

Ballpark
The name of the Taylorville home minor league ballpark is not directly referenced. Since the late 1850's, the Manners Park site has served as a public park in Taylorville. Manners Park is still in use today, with "several ballfields." The park is located at 18 Manners Park Road.

Timeline

Year–by–year records

Notable alumni

Joe Adams (1911, MGR)
Coonie Blank (1911)
Fred Donovan (1911)
Elmer Johnson (1908)
Phil Ketter (1907, MGR)
Art Phelan (1908)
Ray Schalk (1911)

See also
Taylorville Tailors playersTaylorville Christians players

References

External references
Taylorville - Baseball Reference

Defunct minor league baseball teams
Defunct baseball teams in Illinois
Baseball teams established in 1907
Baseball teams disestablished in 1908
Eastern Illinois League teams
Christian County, Illinois